Cemetery of Splendour is a 2015 Thai drama film written, produced, and directed by Apichatpong Weerasethakul. The plot revolves around a spreading epidemic of sleeping sickness where spirits appear to the stricken and hallucination becomes indistinguishable from reality. The epidemic is used as a metaphor for personal and Thai societal issues. The film premiered in the Un Certain Regard section at the 2015 Cannes Film Festival to critical acclaim.

Plot 
Soldiers with a mysterious sleeping sickness are transferred to a temporary clinic in a former school. The memory-filled space becomes a revelatory world for housewife and volunteer Jenjira, as she watches over Itt, a handsome soldier with no family visitors. Jen befriends young medium Keng who uses her psychic powers to help loved ones communicate with the comatose men. Doctors explore ways, including colored light therapy, to ease the men's troubled dreams. Jen discovers Itt's cryptic notebook of strange writings and blueprint sketches. There may be a connection between the soldiers' enigmatic syndrome and the mythic ancient site that lies beneath the clinic. Magic, healing, romance and dreams are all part of Jen's tender path to a deeper awareness of herself and the world around her.

Cast
 Banlop Lomnoi as Itt
 Jenjira Pongpas as Jenjira
 Jarinpattra Rueangram as Keng
 Petcharat Chaiburi as Nurse Tet

Release 
Cemetery of Splendour premiered at the 2015 Cannes Film Festival in the Un Certain Regard section.

Reception

Critical response 
On Rotten Tomatoes, the film holds a 97% approval rating based on 71 reviews, with an average rating of 8/10. The site's consensus reads, "Cemetery of Splendour gracefully eludes efforts to pin down its meaning while offering patient viewers another gently hypnotic wonder from writer/director Apichatpong Weerasethakul." On Metacritic, the film has a weighted average score of 87 out of 100 based on 17 reviews, indicating "universal acclaim".

Year-end lists
Cemetery of Splendour was ranked 5th in the Sight & Sound 20 best films of 2015, and 2nd in the Cahiers du Cinémas 2015 Top Ten chart.

Accolades

References

External links
 Official kick the machine site
 
 

2015 films
2015 drama films
Thai drama films
Thai-language films
Films directed by Apichatpong Weerasethakul